Teper is a Yiddish occupational surname for a potter. Notable people with this name include:
Doug Teper (born 1958), American politician and businessman from the U.S. state of Georgia
Erkan Teper (born 1982), German professional boxer
Isaac Teper, Ukrainian anarchist
Ios Teper (1915–2013), Soviet Jew in the military
Meir Teper, American film producer and businessman

References

Yiddish-language surnames
Occupational surnames